John Fountain (27 May 1932 - August 2012) was an English footballer who played in the Football League as a wing half for Sheffield United, Swindon Town and York City. He received a prison sentence in 1964 for his part in the betting scandal which shook British football in the early 1960s.

References

External links
 

1932 births
2012 deaths
Footballers from Leeds
English footballers
Association football midfielders
Leeds Ashley Road F.C. players
Sheffield United F.C. players
Swindon Town F.C. players
York City F.C. players
English Football League players
Sportspeople involved in betting scandals
Sportspeople convicted of crimes